was a Japanese pop music idol group named after the character Hikaru Genji of The Tale of Genji. They were managed by Japanese talent agency Johnny & Associates from 1987 to 1995.

History
Until the appearance of another pop group represented by Johnny & Associates (Hey! Say! 7) in 2007, Hikaru Genji held the record for the youngest male group to top the Oricon singles charts. In 1988, Hikaru Genji became the second artist in history to monopolize the top three spots on the Oricon singles chart and the third artist in history to dominate the top two spots on the charts. They also won the Japan Record Award in the 30th Japan Record Awards for their song "Paradise Ginga" that same year, making them the second Johnny's artist to win the award after Masahiko Kondo and the last before Johnny & Associates established a policy that would decline all future nominations of awards from organizations such as the Japan Record Awards and the Japan Academy Awards.

In 1994, Mikio Osawa and Hiroyuki Sato left the group and the remaining members formed Hikaru Genji Super 5, which disbanded a year later. Of these five, Kazumi Morohoshi and Junichi Yamamoto have since left the company. Only Atsuhiro Sato and Kohji Uchiumi currently remain with Johnny & Associates as Akira Akasaka was arrested for possession of methamphetamine on October 28, 2007 and was subsequently fired.

Members
Hikaru
: Leader
: Vocal
Genji
: Center
: Vocal
: Main Vocal
: Vocal
: Vocal

Hikaru Genji Discography

Singles
 "Star Light"
 
 
 
 
 
 
 
 "Little Birthday"
 "Co Co Ro"
 
 
 
 "Winning Run"
 "Growing Up"
 "Take Off"
 
 "Meet Me"
 
 
 
 "Boys in August"
 
 
 
 "Try to Remember"

Albums
 
 Hi!
 Hey! Say!
 Hello... I Love You
 
 Cool Summer
 
 333 Thank You
 
 Victory
 Best Friends
 
 Dream Passport
 Speedy Age
 Welcome
 
 Heart'n Hearts
 Forever Yours
 Super Best Try to Remember
 See You Again

Hikaru Genji Super 5 Discography

Singles
 "Melody Five"
 
 "Bye-Bye"

Album 
 Someone Special

Awards

Japan Record Awards

|-
| 1988
| "Paradise Ginga"
| Japan Record Award
| 
|-
|}

Japan Gold Disc Awards
Hikaru Genji won fifteen awards from Recording Industry Association of Japan's annual music awards ceremony, the Japan Gold Disc Awards.

|-
| rowspan="5"| 1988
| rowspan="2"| Hikaru Genji
| New Artist Award
| 
|-
| Best 5 New Artist Award
| 
|-
| "Glass no Jūdai"
| rowspan="2" | Singles Award
| 
|-
| "Starlight"
| 
|-
| Hikaru Genji
| Album Award
| 
|-
| rowspan="6"| 1989
| Hikaru Genji
| Best 5 Artists
| 
|-
| rowspan="2"| "Paradise Ginga"
| Grand Prix Singles Award
| 
|-
| rowspan="3"| Best 5 Singles Award
| 
|-
| "Diamond Hurricane"
| 
|-
| "Tsurugi no Mai"
| 
|-
| Hi!
| Album Award
| 
|-
| 1990
| "Taiyō ga Ippai"
| Best 5 Singles Award
| 
|-
| 1991
| Furikaette Tomorrow
| rowspan="3"| Album Award
| 
|-
| 1992
| 333 Thank You
| 
|-
| 1993
| Best Friends
| 
|}

References

Japanese idol groups
Japanese pop music groups
Japanese boy bands
Johnny & Associates